Hrunamannahreppur is a municipality located in Iceland. Its major settlement is Flúðir.

The district abuts the Highlands, so that farmers' livestock occasionally strays there.

Hrunamannahreppur and other parts of southwest Iceland were among the first where biting midges (Ceratopogonidae) were detected after their first appearance in Iceland in 2015.

Localities 
Hvítárholt

References 

Municipalities of Iceland